Slomljena Stakla (trans. Broken Glass) was a Yugoslav pop rock band formed in Belgrade in 1982. They were a prominent act of the 1980s Yugoslav rock scene.

History

1982-1991
The band was formed in 1982 by singer and composer Zoran Vasilić. The members of the band's default lineup were, beside Vasilić, Dragan Zarić "Zare" (a former member of the band Kvazar, guitar), Dragan Petrović (former member of the bands Pasta ZZ and Crni Baron, keyboards), Aleksandar Živanović (former Kota 19, Afera, Divlji Anđeli, Desert and Šamar member, bass guitar) and Mladen Lukač (drums). Prior to the recording of their debut album, Dragan Petrović left the band and was replaced by Milan Stanković.

Their debut album, Psiho klub (Psycho Club), produced by Srđan Marjanović, was released in 1983 through ZKP RTLJ. The album  featured Vuk Vujačić on saxophone and Zoran Radetić on keyboards as guest musicians. Backing vocals were sung by Snežana Stamenković and Srđan Marjanović. The album brought the hit "Još jedna votka" ("Another Vodka"). After the album release, Dragan Petrović returned to the band.

In the autumn of 1984, after a large number of concerts, the band released the album Ljubav je kad... (Love Is When...), produced by Saša Habić, through Jugoton. The songs, heavily influenced by the bands of the New Romantic movement, were written by Zarić and Vasilić. The album brought the hits "Una", "Monsunski vetrovi" ("Monsoons"), "Leto je, devojko" ("It Is Summer, Girl"), the title track, and the instrumental track "Senke u noći" ("Shadows in the Night"). Soon after the album was released, the band was joined by the new bass guitarist, Vladan Vasiljević, and the new drummer, Ivan Ranković. However, despite the success of the album, in mid-1985 the band went on a hiatus.

The album Samo ljubav može to (Only Love Can Do That), released in 1988 through PGP-RTB, marked a shift towards harder, power pop sound, with some songs featuring folk music elements. The album was recorded by Vasilić, Petrović and the new member, Milorad Džmerković (keyboards). It featured studio musicians Safet Petrovac "Saja" on guitar and Dejan Škopelja on bass guitar and former S Vremena Na Vreme members Ljuba Ninković and Asim Sarvan on backing vocals.

In 1991 Vasilić and Petrović, with a group of younger musicians, recorded the album Samo za tebe (Only for You), released through Jugodisk. The album featured a new version "Još jedna votka", entitled "Još jedna votka, još jedno pivo" ("Another Vodka, Another Beer"), and hits "Sledi me" ("Follow Me") and "Ivana", the latter written by Boris Novković. The album was produced by Vasilić and Duda Bezuha, who also played the guitar. It also featured Snežana Ristić on vocals and Milan Komnenić on keyboards. After the album release, Slomljena Stakla ended their activity.

Post breakup
Slomljena Stakla original keyboatdist Dragan Petrović moved to Canada in 1992. He performed in jazz clubs and released the instrumental music album Jazz Café – Jazz After Dark, recorded on his performance in the Galaxy club in Toronto. In 2004 he released the smooth jazz album Café Nervosa, and in 2011 he released the album album The Vibe.

The band's former keyboardist Milorad Džmerković died on 26 September 2022.

Discography

Studio albums 
Psiho klub (1983)
Ljubav je kad... (1984)
Samo ljubav može to (1988)
Samo za tebe (1991)

Singles 
"Monsunski vetrovi" / "Leto je devojko" (1984)

See also 
New wave music in Yugoslavia

References

External links 
 Slomljena Stakla at Discogs

Serbian new wave musical groups
Serbian synthpop groups
Serbian pop rock music groups
Serbian power pop groups
Yugoslav rock music groups
Yugoslav synthpop groups
Musical groups from Belgrade
Musical groups established in 1982
Musical groups disestablished in 1991
1982 establishments in Yugoslavia